Friedrich Dammann (1901–1969) was a German screenwriter and playwright.

Filmography
 Mädchen in Uniform (1931) – Screenplay based on a play by Christa Winsloe
 Wrong Number, Miss (uncredited, credit for Herbert Rosenfeld, 1932), German-language version
 The Telephone Operator (with Herbert Rosenfeld, 1932), Italian-language version
 How Shall I Tell My Husband? (with Herbert Rosenfeld, 1932)
 And Who Is Kissing Me? (with Herbert Rosenfeld, 1933), German-language version
 The Girl with the Bruise (with Herbert Rosenfeld, 1933), Italian-language version
 Gypsy Blood (1934)
 Give Her a Ring (uncredited, 1934) – British remake of Wrong Number, Miss
 My Life for Maria Isabella (1935) – Screenplay based on the novel Die Standarte by Alexander Lernet-Holenia
 Artist Love (1935)
 The Mysterious Mister X (1936) – Screenplay based on the play Dicky by Paul Armont, Marcel Gerbidon and Jean Manoussi
 Premiere (1937)
 Talking About Jacqueline (1937) – Screenplay based on a novel by Katrin Holland
 Crooks in Tails (1937) – Screenplay based on an idea by 
 Paradise for Two (uncredited, 1937) – British remake of And Who Is Kissing Me?
 Premiere (1938) – British remake of Premiere
 Gastspiel im Paradies (1938)
 Kiss Her! (uncredited, 1940) – Swedish remake of And Who Is Kissing Me?
 Aufruhr im Damenstift (1941) – Screenplay based on a play by 
 Everything Will Be Better in the Morning (1948) – Screenplay based on a novel by Annemarie Selinko
 Es begann um Mitternacht (1951)
 Girls in Uniform (uncredited, 1951) – Mexican remake of Mädchen in Uniform
 Happy Go Lovely (1951) – British remake of And Who Is Kissing Me?
 Heute nacht passiert's (1953)

 Ballerina (1956)
 Mädchen in Uniform (1958) – Remake of Mädchen in Uniform
 Pigen og vandpytten (uncredited, 1958) – Danish remake of And Who Is Kissing Me?
  (1959)
 Millionær for en aften (uncredited, 1960) – Norwegian remake of And Who Is Kissing Me?
Director
 Aufruhr im Damenstift (1941)

Play
 Götterkinder (1948)

References

Bibliography 
 Ann C. Paietta. Teachers in the Movies: A Filmography of Depictions of Grade School, Preschool and Day Care Educators, 1890s to the Present. McFarland, 2007.

External links 
 

1901 births
1969 deaths
Writers from Berlin
German male screenwriters
20th-century German screenwriters